The 2013–2014 Bryant Bulldogs men's basketball team represented Bryant University during the 2013–14 NCAA Division I men's basketball season. The team was led by sixth year head coach Tim O'Shea and played their home games at the Chace Athletic Center. They were members of the Northeast Conference.  They finished the season at 18–14 overall and 10–6 in conference play, for a third-place finish. Bryant, the third seed, was upset by Saint Francis (PA), the seventh seed, in the NEC tournament quarterfinals.

Roster

Schedule

|-
!colspan=9 style="background:#000000; color:#CCCC99;"| Regular season

|-
!colspan=9 style="background:#000000; color:#CCCC99;"| 2014 Northeast Conference tournament

References

Bryant Bulldogs men's basketball seasons
Bryant
Bryant
Bryant